Henry O'Neill (August 10, 1891 – May 18, 1961) was an American film actor known for playing gray-haired fathers, lawyers, and similarly dignified roles during the 1930s and 1940s.

Early years
He was born in Orange, New Jersey.

Career 
O'Neill began his acting career on the stage, after dropping out of college to join a traveling theatre company. He served in the Navy in World War I, after which he worked at several jobs, including being an usher in a funeral home. Eventually, he returned to the stage. His Broadway debut came in The Spring (1921), and his final Broadway appearance was in Shooting Star (1933). He also acted with the Provincetown Players and the Celtic Players.

In the early 1930s he began appearing in films, including The Big Shakedown (1934), the Western Santa Fe Trail (1940), the musical Anchors Aweigh (1945), The Green Years (1946), and The Reckless Moment (1949). His last film was The Wings of Eagles (1957), starring John Wayne.

Personal life 
He was on the board of directors of the Screen Actors Guild and has a star on the Hollywood Walk of Fame. 

In 1924, O'Neill married Anna Barry. They had one child and remained wed until his death.

O'Neill died in Hollywood, California, at the age of 69. His remains are interred at San Fernando Mission Cemetery in North Hollywood.

Selected filmography

I Loved a Woman (1933) as Mr. Farrell
Ever in My Heart (1933) as Naturalization Judge (uncredited)
The Kennel Murder Case (1933) as Dubois, Police Fingerprint Man (uncredited)
From Headquarters (1933) as Inspector Donnelly
The World Changes (1933) as Orin Nordholm Sr.
Son of a Sailor (1933) as Naval Officer (uncredited)
The House on 56th Street (1933) as Baxter, the Lawyer (uncredited)
Lady Killer (1933) as Ramick
The Big Shakedown (1934) as Mr. Sheffner
Massacre (1934) as J.R. Dickinson
Bedside (1934) as Dr. William Chester
I've Got Your Number (1934) as John P. Schuyler
Fashion Follies of 1934 (1934) as Duryea
Wonder Bar (1934) as Richard, the Maitre'd
Midnight (1934) as Ingersoll
Journal of a Crime (1934) as Doctor
Upper World (1934) as Banker Making Toast at banquet
Twenty Million Sweethearts (1934) as Lemuel Tappan
The Key (1934, aka High Peril) as Dan
Fog Over Frisco (1934) as Porter
The Personality Kid (1934) as Stephens
Now I'll Tell (1934) as Tommy Doran
Madame DuBarry (1934) as Duc de Choiseul
Side Streets (1934) as George Richards
Confessions of a Nazi Spy (1939)  
Midnight Alibi (1954) as Jonathan Ardsley
The Man with Two Faces (1934) as Inspector Crane
Big Hearted Herbert (1934) as Goodrich Sr.
Gentlemen Are Born (1934) as Mr. Harper
Flirtation Walk (1934) as Gen. Fitts
Murder in the Clouds (1934) as John Brownell
The Secret Bride (1934) as Jim Lansdale
The Man Who Reclaimed His Head (1934) as Fernand de Marnay
Bordertown (1935) as Attorney J.L. Chase (uncredited)
Sweet Music (1935) as Louis Trumble
The Great Hotel Murder (1935) as Mr. Harvey
Living on Velvet (1935) as Harold Thornton
While the Patient Slept (1935) as Dimuck
The Florentine Dagger (1935) as Victor Ballau
Black Fury (1935) as Hendricks
Alias Mary Dow (1935) as Henry Dow
Dinky (1935) as Colonel Barnes
Oil for the Lamps of China (1935) as Edward Hartford
Stranded (1935) as Mr. Tuthill
Bright Lights (1935) as J.C. Anderson
We're in the Money (1935) as Lawyer Stephen 'Dinsy' Dinsmore
Special Agent (1935) as District Attorney Roger Quinn
The Case of the Lucky Legs (1935) as District Attorney Manchester
Dr. Socrates (1935) as Greer
Personal Maid's Secret (1935) as Mr. Wilton Palmer
I Found Stella Parish (1935) as Trailer Narrator (voice, uncredited)
Two Against the World (1936) as Jim Carstairs
Freshman Love (1936) as Pres. Simpkins
The Petrified Forest (1936) as Trailer Narrator (voice, uncredited)
The Story of Louis Pasteur (1936) as Dr. Emile Roux
Road Gang (1936) as George Winston
The Walking Dead (1936) as District Attorney Werner
Boulder Dam (1936) as Mr. Agnew
The Golden Arrow (1936) as Mr. Appleby
Bullets or Ballots (1936) as Ward Bryant
The Big Noise (1936) as Charlie Caldwell
The White Angel (1936) as Dr. Scott
Anthony Adverse (1936) as Father Xavier
Rainbow on the River (1936) as Father Josef
Green Light (1937) as Dr. Endicott
The Great O'Malley (1937) as Attorney for the Defense
Marked Woman (1937) as District Attorney Arthur Sheldon
Draegerman Courage (1937) as Dr. Thomas Haslett
The Go Getter (1937) as Commander Tisdale
The Singing Marine (1937) as Captain Skinner
Mr. Dodd Takes the Air (1937) as D.M. Gateway
The Life of Emile Zola (1937) as Colonel Georges Picquart
Submarine D-1 (1937) as Admiral Thomas
First Lady (1937) as George Mason
Wells Fargo (1937) as Henry Wells
The Great Garrick (1937)
White Banners (1938) as Sam Trimble
Gold Is Where You Find It (1938) as Judge
Jezebel (1938) as General Theopholus Bogardus
Yellow Jack (1938) as Gorgas
Racket Busters (1938) as Governor
The Amazing Dr. Clitterhouse (1938) as Judge
The Chaser (1938) as Mr. Calhoun
Girls on Probation (1938) as Judge
Brother Rat (1938) as Colonel Ramm
Torchy Blane in Chinatown (1939) as Senator Baldwin
Wings of the Navy (1939) as Prologue Speaker
Dodge City (1939) as Col. Dodge
The Man Who Dared (1939) as Matthew Carter
Juarez (1939) as General Miguel Miramon
Confessions of a Nazi Spy (1939) as Attorney Kellogg
Lucky Night (1939) as Calvin Jordan
Sons of Liberty (1939, Short) as Member of Continental Congress
Everybody's Hobby (1939) as Thomas 'Tom' Leslie
The Angels Wash Their Faces (1939) as Remson Sr.
A Child Is Born (1939) as Dr. Lee
Four Wives (1939) as Dr. Clinton Forrest, Sr.
Invisible Stripes (1939) as Parole Officer Masters
The Fighting 69th (1940) as The Colonel
Calling Philo Vance (1940) as Markham
Dr. Ehrlich's Magic Bullet (1940) as Dr. Lentz
Castle on the Hudson (1940) as District Attorney
'Til We Meet Again (1940) as Dr. Cameron
They Drive by Night (1940) as The District Attorney (uncredited)
Money and the Woman (1940) as Mr. Mason
Service with the Colors (1940, Short) as Col. Nelson
Knute Rockne, All American (1940) as Doctor
Santa Fe Trail (1940) as Cyrus Holliday
Keeping Company (1940)
Brother Rat and a Baby (1940)
Maisie Was a Lady (1941) as Minor Role (scenes deleted)
The Trial of Mary Dugan (1941) as Galway
Men of Boys Town (1941) as Mr. Maitland
Billy the Kid (1941) as Tim Ward
The Get-Away (1941) as Warden Alcott
Blossoms in the Dust (1941) as Judge
Whistling in the Dark (1941) as Philip Post
Down in San Diego (1941) as Col. Halliday
Honky Tonk (1941) as Daniel Wells
Shadow of the Thin Man (1941) as Maj. Jason I. Sculley
Johnny Eager (1941) as Mr. Verne
The Bugle Sounds (1942) as Lt. Col. Harry Seton
Mr. and Mrs. North (1942) as Undetermined Role (scenes deleted)
Born to Sing (1942) as Frank Eastman
This Time for Keeps (1942) as Arthur Freeman
Tortilla Flat (1942) as Father Ramon
Pierre of the Plains (1942) as Undetermined Role (scenes deleted)
White Cargo (1942) as The Reverend Dr. Roberts
Stand By for Action (1942) as Cmdr. Stone M.C
The Human Comedy (1943) as Charles Steed
Air Raid Wardens (1943) as Rittenhause
Dr. Gillespie's Criminal Case (1943) as Warden Kenneson
Best Foot Forward (1943) as Maj. Reeber
Thousands Cheer (1943) as Captain in Frank Morgan Skit (uncredited)
Girl Crazy (1943) as Mr. Churchill Sr.
Lost Angel (1943) as Professor Josh Pringle
A Guy Named Joe (1943) as Col. Sykes
Whistling in Brooklyn (1943) as Inspector Holcomb
Main Street Today (1944, Short) as Vance Clark
The Heavenly Body (1944) as Prof. Stowe
Rationing (1944) as Sen. Edward A. White
Two Girls and a Sailor (1944) as John Dyckman Brown II
Barbary Coast Gent (1944) as Colonel Watrous
Nothing but Trouble (1944) as Mr. Hawkley
This Man's Navy (1945) as Lt. Cmdr. Roger Graystone
Keep Your Powder Dry (1945) as Major General Lee Rand
Between Two Women (1945) as Larry Goff, Theatrical Agent (uncredited)
Dangerous Partners (1945) as Police Lt. Duffy
Anchors Aweigh (1945) as Admiral Hammond
The Hoodlum Saint (1946) as Lewis J. Malbery
The Green Years (1946) as Canon Roche
The Virginian (1946) as Mr. Taylor
Bad Bascomb (1946) as Gov. Winton
Little Mr. Jim (1946) as Chaplain
Three Wise Fools (1946) as Prof. Horace Appleby
The Beginning or the End (1947) as General Thomas F. Farrell  
The Return of October (1948) as President Hotchkiss
Leather Gloves (1948) as Dudley
Alias Nick Beal (1949) as Judge Hobson
You're My Everything (1949) as Professor Adams
Strange Bargain (1949) as Timothy Hearne
The Reckless Moment (1949) as Tom Harper
Holiday Affair (1949) as Mr. Crowley
No Man of Her Own (1950) as Mr. Harkness
The Second Woman (1950) as Ben Sheppard
Convicted (1950) as Detective Dorn
The Milkman (1950) as Roger Bradley Sr.
The Flying Missile (1950) as RAdm. Thomas A. Scott
The People Against O'Hara (1951) as Judge Keating
The Family Secret (1951) as Donald Muir
Scandal Sheet (1952) as Charlie Barnes
Scarlet Angel (1952) as Morgan Caldwell
The Sun Shines Bright (1953) as Joe D. Habersham
Untamed (1955) as Squire O'Neill
The Wings of Eagles (1957) as Capt. Spear
North by Northwest (1959) as Man in Plaza Bar (uncredited) (final film role)

References

External links

1891 births
1961 deaths
American male film actors
American male stage actors
Male actors from New Jersey
20th-century American male actors
Burials at San Fernando Mission Cemetery
United States Navy personnel of World War I